Marcel Pigulea (born 24 May 1943) is a Romanian former football player and manager.

Playing career
Born in Albuleşti, Pigulea played club football for Dunărea Giurgiu, Flacăra Roşie București, Metalul București, Sportul, Argeș Pitești and CSM Școlar Reșița.

Coaching career
Pigulea coached Romanian sides Chimia Râmnicu Vâlcea, Politehnica Timișoara, Romania U18, Dunărea Galați, Gloria Buzău, Moroccan side Hassania Agadir and the Algerian national team.

Honours

Club 
Argeș Pitești 	
Romanian League: 1971–72

Notes

References

External links 
Profile in Divizia A at labtof.ro

1943 births
Living people
Romanian footballers
FC Sportul Studențesc București players
FC Argeș Pitești players
CSM Reșița players
Association football fullbacks
Romanian football managers
Romanian expatriate football managers
Expatriate football managers in Morocco
Expatriate football managers in Algeria
Romanian expatriate sportspeople in Morocco
Romanian expatriate sportspeople in Algeria
FC Politehnica Timișoara managers
FC Gloria Buzău managers
Hassania Agadir managers
Algeria national football team managers
FC UTA Arad managers